The U.S. city of San Antonio, Texas is home to 93 high-rises, 15 of which are skyscrapers that stand at least  feet tall. Completed for HemisFair '68, it is the tallest structure in Texas (excluding radio antennas) south of Houston, the second-tallest observation tower in the United States, and third-tallest in the Western Hemisphere. The second-tallest structure and tallest building in the city is the Marriott Rivercenter.

The history of skyscrapers in San Antonio began with the construction of the Tower Life Building (originally the Smith-Young Tower) in 1928, which is often regarded as the first skyscraper in the city. Proposed towers in the central city are Villita Tower a 32-story residential tower, Canopy by Hilton, a 24-story tower on the Riverwalk and the 21-story Thompson Hotels & Residences. 
In early October 2017, notice of a  Ferris wheel/observation wheel was given to the FAA for an area south of Downtown San Antonio.

Tallest buildings: delivered 

This includes spires and architectural details. An equal sign (=) following a rank indicates the same height between two or more buildings. The "Year" column indicates the year in which a building was completed

Tallest buildings: site prep or under construction

The following are central business district projects which will rise at least .

Tallest buildings: approved, site plan under review or proposed

The following are central business district projects which are to rise at least .

* Table entries with dashes (—) indicate that information regarding building heights or dates of completion has not yet been released

See also

 List of tallest buildings in Texas
 List of tallest buildings in the United States
 List of tallest structures in the United States
 List of tallest buildings in Austin
 List of tallest buildings in Dallas
 List of tallest buildings in El Paso
 List of tallest buildings in Fort Worth
 List of tallest buildings in Houston

References
.

 Tallest buildings in San Antonio-Emporis.com

Tallest
San Antonio
San Antonio

Tallest buildings